August Specht (1 August 1849, Lauffen am Neckar – 26 May 1923, Stuttgart) was a German natural history artist and painter.
He was a pupil of Heinrich Läpple and Albert Kappis. In 1898 he published Specht's Tierbilder-Buch with descriptions in verse of the depicted animals. Like his brother Friedrich Specht, he also produced illustrations of animals and landscapes for a number of publications, such as Brehms Tierleben and Die Gartenlaube.

Specht's brothers were the wood engraver Carl Gottlob Specht and the animal painter and illustrator Friedrich Specht.

References

External links

19th-century German painters
German male painters
20th-century German painters
20th-century German male artists
1849 births
1923 deaths
19th-century German male artists